Royal Institute or Royal Institution may refer to:

In the UK
 Royal Institute of British Architects
 Royal Institute of Chemistry
 Royal Institute of Navigation, UK professional organisation
 Royal Institute of Oil Painters
 Royal Institute of Painters in Water Colours
 Royal Institute of Philosophy
 Royal Institution of Great Britain
 Royal Institution for the Encouragement of the Fine Arts, now the Royal Scottish Academy
 Royal Institution of Chartered Surveyors
 Royal Archaeological Institute
 Royal Anthropological Institute of Great Britain and Ireland
 Royal Belfast Academical Institution
 Royal Black Institution
 Royal National Institute of Blind People
 Royal National Institute for Deaf People
 Royal National Lifeboat Institution
 Royal Town Planning Institute
 Royal United Services Institute
 Liverpool Royal Institution
 Chatham House (Royal Institute of International Affairs)

In Australia
 Royal Institute for Deaf and Blind Children, Sydney, Australia
 Royal Australian Chemical Institute
 Royal Australian Institute of Architects
 Royal Australian Institute of Architects Gold Medal

In other countries
 Royal Institute of Technology, Stockholm, Sweden
 Royal Institute of Thailand
 Royal Institute of the Amazigh Culture, Rabat, Morocco
 Royal Institute of the Architects of Ireland
 Royal Architectural Institute of Canada
 Royal Belgian Institute of Natural Sciences
 Royal Canadian Institute
 Grand Ducal Institute, Luxembourg
 Royal New Zealand Institute of Horticulture
 KNMI (institute) (Royal Dutch Meteorological Institute)
 Royal Cork Institution, Ireland

See also